Abu'l-Fath Jalal-ud-din Muhammad Akbar (15 October 1542 – 27 October 1605), popularly known as Akbar the Great, and also as Akbar I, was the third Mughal emperor, who reigned from 1556 to 1605. Akbar succeeded his father, Humayun, under a regent, Bairam Khan, who helped the young emperor expand and consolidate Mughal domains in India.

A strong personality and a successful general, Akbar gradually enlarged the Mughal Empire to include much of the Indian subcontinent. His power and influence, however, extended over the entire subcontinent because of Mughal military, political, cultural, and economic dominance. To unify the vast Mughal state, Akbar established a centralised system of administration throughout his empire and adopted a policy of conciliating conquered rulers through marriage and diplomacy. To preserve peace and order in a religiously and culturally diverse empire, he adopted policies that won him the support of his non-Muslim subjects. Eschewing tribal bonds and Islamic state identity, Akbar strove to unite far-flung lands of his realm through loyalty, expressed through an Indo-Persian culture, to himself as an emperor.

Mughal India developed a strong and stable economy, leading to commercial expansion and greater patronage of culture. Akbar himself was a patron of art and culture. He was fond of literature, and created a library of over 24,000 volumes written in Sanskrit, Urdu, Persian, Greek, Latin, Arabic, and Kashmiri, staffed by many scholars, translators, artists, calligraphers, scribes, bookbinders, and readers. He did much of the cataloging himself. Akbar also established the library of Fatehpur Sikri exclusively for women, and he decreed the establishment of schools for the education of both Muslims and Hindus throughout the realm. He also encouraged bookbinding to become a high art. Holy men of many faiths, poets, architects, and artisans all over the world adorned his court from for study and discussion. Akbar's courts at Delhi, Agra, and Fatehpur Sikri became centres of the arts, letters, and learning. Timurid and Perso-Islamic culture began to merge and blend with indigenous Indian elements, and a distinct Indo-Persian culture emerged characterized by Mughal style arts, painting, and architecture. Disillusioned with orthodox Islam and perhaps hoping to bring about religious unity within his empire, Akbar promulgated Din-i-Ilahi, a syncretic creed derived mainly from Islam and Hinduism as well as elements of Zoroastrianism and Christianity.

Akbar's reign significantly influenced the course of Indian history. During his rule, the Mughal Empire tripled in size and wealth. He created a powerful military system and instituted effective political and social reforms. By abolishing the sectarian tax on non-Muslims and appointing them to high civil and military posts, he was the first Mughal ruler to win the trust and loyalty of the native subjects. He had Sanskrit literature translated, participated in native festivals, realising that a stable empire depended on the co-operation and good-will of his subjects. Thus, the foundations for a multicultural empire under Mughal rule were laid during his reign. Akbar was succeeded as emperor by his son, Prince Salim, later known as Jahangir.

Early years
Defeated in battles at Chausa and Kannauj in 1539 to 1541 by the forces of Sher Shah Suri, Mughal emperor Humayun fled westward to Sindh. There he met and married the 14-year-old Hamida Banu Begum, daughter of Shaikh Ali Akbar Jami, a Persian teacher of Humayun's younger brother Hindal Mirza. Jalal ud-din Muhammad Akbar was born the next year on 25 October 1542 (the fifth day of Rajab, 949 AH) at the Rajput Fortress of Amarkot in Rajputana (in modern-day Sindh), where his parents had been given refuge by the local Hindu ruler Rana Prasad.

During the extended period of Humayun's exile, Akbar was brought up in Kabul by the his extended family of paternal uncles, Kamran Mirza and Askari Mirza, and his aunts, in particular Kamran Mirza's wife. He spent his youth learning to hunt, run, and fight, making him a daring, powerful, and brave warrior, but he never learned to read or write. This, however, did not hinder his search for knowledge. It is said that when he retired in the evening he would have someone read to him. On 20 November 1551, Humayun's youngest brother, Hindal Mirza, died in a battle against Kamran Mirza's forces. Upon hearing the news of his brother's death, Humayun was overwhelmed with grief.

About the time of nine-year-old Akbar's first appointment as governor of Ghazni, he married Hindal's daughter, Ruqaiya Sultan Begum. Humayun gave Akbar command of Hindal's troops and conferred on the imperial couple all of Hindal's wealth. Akbar's marriage to Ruqaiya was solemnized in Jalandhar, Punjab, when they both were 14-years-old. She was his first wife and chief consort.

Following the chaos over the succession of Sher Shah Suri's son Islam Shah, Humayun reconquered Delhi in 1555, leading an army partly provided by his Persian ally Tahmasp I. A few months later, Humayun died. Akbar's guardian, Bairam Khan concealed the death in order to prepare for Akbar's succession. Akbar succeeded Humayun on 14 February 1556, while in the midst of a war against Sikandar Shah to reclaim the Mughal throne. In Kalanaur, Punjab, the 14-year-old Akbar was enthroned by Bairam Khan on a newly constructed platform, which still stands. He was proclaimed Shahanshah (Persian for "King of Kings"). Bairam Khan ruled on his behalf until he came of age.

Military campaigns

Military innovations

Akbar had a record of unbeaten military campaigns that consolidated Mughal rule in the Indian subcontinent. The basis of this military prowess and authority was Akbar's skilful structural and organisational calibration of the Mughal army. The Mansabdari system in particular has been acclaimed for its role in upholding Mughal power in the time of Akbar. The system persisted with few changes down to the end of the Mughal Empire, but was progressively weakened under his successors.

Organisational reforms were accompanied by innovations in cannons, fortifications, and the use of elephants. Akbar also took an interest in matchlocks and effectively employed them during various conflicts. He sought the help of Ottomans, and also increasingly of Europeans, especially Portuguese and Italians, in procuring firearms and artillery. Mughal firearms in the time of Akbar came to be far superior to anything that could be deployed by regional rulers, tributaries, or by zamindars. Such was the impact of these weapons that Akbar's Vizier, Abul Fazl, once declared that "with the exception of Turkey, there is perhaps no country in which its guns has more means of securing the Government than [India]." The term "gunpowder empire" has thus often been used by scholars and historians in analysing the success of the Mughals in India. Mughal power has been seen as owing to their mastery of the techniques of warfare, especially the use of firearms encouraged by Akbar.

Struggle for North India 

Akbar's father Humayun had regained control of the Punjab, Delhi, and Agra with Safavid support, but even in these areas Mughal rule was precarious, and when the Surs reconquered Agra and Delhi following the death of Humayun, the fate of the boy emperor seemed uncertain. Akbar's minority and the lack of any possibility of military assistance from the Mughal stronghold of Kabul, which was in the throes of an invasion by the ruler of Badakhshan Prince Mirza Suleiman, aggravated the situation. When his regent, Bairam Khan, called a council of war to marshall the Mughal forces, none of Akbar's chieftains approved. Bairam Khan was ultimately able to prevail over the nobles, however, and it was decided that the Mughals would march against the strongest of the Sur rulers, Sikandar Shah Suri, in the Punjab. Delhi was left under the regency of Tardi Baig Khan. Sikandar Shah Suri, however, presented no major concern for Akbar, and avoided giving battle as the Mughal army approached. The gravest threat came from Hemu, a minister and general of one of the Sur rulers, who had proclaimed himself Hindu emperor and expelled the Mughals from the Indo-Gangetic plains.

Urged by Bairam Khan, who re-marshalled the Mughal army before Hemu could consolidate his position, Akbar marched on Delhi to reclaim it. Soon after the battle, Mughal forces occupied Delhi and then Agra. Akbar made a triumphant entry into Delhi, where he stayed for a month. Then he and Bairam Khan returned to Punjab to deal with Sikandar Shah, who had become active again. In the next six months, the Mughals won another major battle against Sikander Shah Suri, who fled east to Bengal. Akbar and his forces occupied Lahore and then seized Multan in the Punjab. In 1558, Akbar took possession of Ajmer, the aperture to Rajputana, after the defeat and flight of its Muslim ruler. The Mughals had also besieged and defeated the Sur forces in control of Gwalior Fort, the greatest stronghold north of the Narmada river.

Royal begums, along with the families of Mughal amirs, were finally brought over from Kabul to India at the time – according to Akbar's vizier, Abul Fazl, "so that men might become settled and be restrained in some measure from departing to a country to which they were accustomed". Akbar had firmly declared his intentions that the Mughals were in India to stay. This was a far cry from the political settlements of his grandfather, Babur, and father, Humayun, both of whom had done little to indicate that they were anything but transient rulers. However, Akbar methodically re-introduced a historical legacy of the Timurid Renaissance that his ancestors had left.

Expansion into Central India

By 1559, the Mughals had launched a drive to the south into Rajputana and Malwa. However, Akbar's disputes with his regent, Bairam Khan, temporarily put an end to the expansion. The young emperor, at the age of eighteen, wanted to take a more active part in managing affairs. Urged on by his foster mother, Maham Anga, and his relatives, Akbar decided to dispense with the services of Bairam Khan. After yet another dispute at court, Akbar finally dismissed Bairam Khan in the spring of 1560 and ordered him to leave on Hajj to Mecca. Bairam Khan left for Mecca but on his way was goaded by his opponents to rebel. He was defeated by the Mughal army in the Punjab and forced to submit. Akbar forgave him, however, and gave him the option of either continuing in his court or resuming his pilgrimage; Bairam chose the latter. Bairam Khan was later assassinated on his way to Mecca, allegedly by an Afghan with a personal vendetta.

In 1560, Akbar resumed military operations. A Mughal army under the command of his foster brother, Adham Khan, and a Mughal commander, Pir Muhammad Khan, began the Mughal conquest of Malwa. The Afghan ruler, Baz Bahadur, was defeated at the Battle of Sarangpur and fled to Khandesh for refuge leaving behind his harem, treasure, and war elephants. Despite initial success, the campaign proved a disaster from Akbar's point of view. His foster brother retained all the spoils and followed through with the Central Asian practice of slaughtering the surrendered garrison, their wives and children, and many Muslim theologians and Sayyids, who were the descendants of Muhammad. Akbar personally rode to Malwa to confront Adham Khan and relieve him of command. Pir Muhammad Khan was then sent in pursuit of Baz Bahadur but was beaten back by the alliance of the rulers of Khandesh and Berar. Baz Bahadur temporarily regained control of Malwa until, in the next year, Akbar sent another Mughal army to invade and annex the kingdom. Malwa became a province of the nascent imperial administration of Akbar's regime. Baz Bahadur survived as a refugee at various courts until, eight years later in 1570, he took service under Akbar.

Despite the ultimate success in Malwa, the conflict exposed cracks in Akbar's personal relationships with his relatives and Mughal nobles. When Adham Khan confronted Akbar following another dispute in 1562, he was struck down by the emperor and thrown from a terrace into the palace courtyard at Agra. Still alive, Adham Khan was dragged up and thrown to the courtyard once again by Akbar to ensure his death. Akbar now sought to eliminate the threat of over-mighty subjects. He created specialised ministerial posts relating to imperial governance; no member of the Mughal nobility was to have unquestioned pre-eminence. When a powerful clan of Uzbek chiefs broke out in rebellion in 1564, Akbar decisively defeated and routed them in Malwa and then Bihar. He pardoned the rebellious leaders, hoping to conciliate them, but they rebelled again, so Akbar had to quell their uprising a second time. Following a third revolt with the proclamation of Mirza Muhammad Hakim, Akbar's brother and the Mughal ruler of Kabul, as emperor, his patience was finally exhausted. Several Uzbek chieftains were subsequently slain and the rebel leaders trampled to death under elephants. Simultaneously the Mirzas, a group of Akbar's distant cousins who held important fiefs near Agra, had also risen up in rebellion. They too were slain and driven out of the empire. In 1566, Akbar moved to meet the forces of his brother, Muhammad Hakim, who had marched into the Punjab with dreams of seizing the imperial throne. Following a brief confrontation, however, Muhammad Hakim accepted Akbar's supremacy and retreated back to Kabul.

In 1564, Mughal forces began the conquest of Garha, a thinly populated, hilly area in central India that was of interest to the Mughals because of its herd of wild elephants. The territory was ruled over by Raja Vir Narayan, a minor, and his mother, Durgavati, a Rajput warrior queen of the Gonds. Akbar did not personally lead the campaign because he was preoccupied with the Uzbek rebellion, leaving the expedition in the hands of Asaf Khan, the Mughal governor of Kara. Durgavati committed suicide after her defeat at the Battle of Damoh, while Raja Vir Narayan was slain at the Fall of Chauragarh, the mountain fortress of the Gonds. The Mughals seized immense wealth, an uncalculated amount of gold and silver, jewels, and 1000 elephants. Kamala Devi, a younger sister of Durgavati, was sent to the Mughal harem. The brother of Durgavati's deceased husband was installed as the Mughal administrator of the region. Like in Malwa, however, Akbar entered into a dispute with his vassals over the conquest of Gondwana. Asaf Khan was accused of keeping most of the treasures and sending back only 200 elephants to Akbar. When summoned to give accounts, he fled Gondwana. He went first to the Uzbeks, then returned to Gondwana where he was pursued by Mughal forces. Finally, he submitted and Akbar restored him to his previous position.

Assassination attempt
Around 1564, there was an assassination attempt on Akbar that was depicted in a painting. The incident took place as Akbar was returning from a visit to the dargah of Hazrat Nizamuddin near Delhi, when an assassin shot an arrow that pierced his right shoulder. The Emperor ordered the apprehended assassin, a slave of Mirza Sharfuddin, a noble in Akbar's court whose recent rebellion had been suppressed, to be beheaded.

Conquest of Rajputana

Having established Mughal rule over northern India, Akbar turned his attention to the conquest of Rajputana. No imperial power in India based on the Indo-Gangetic plains could be secure if a rival centre of power existed on its flank in Rajputana. The Mughals had already established domination over parts of northern Rajputana in Mewat, Ajmer, and Nagor. Akbar was then determined to drive into the heartlands of the Rajput kings that had rarely previously submitted to the Muslim rulers of the Delhi Sultanate. Beginning in 1561, the Mughals actively engaged the Rajputs in warfare and diplomacy. Most Rajput states accepted Akbar's suzerainty; the rulers of Mewar and Marwar, Udai Singh, and Chandrasen Rathore, however, remained outside the imperial fold. Rana Udai Singh was descended from the Sisodia ruler, Rana Sanga, who had fought Babur at the Battle of Khanwa in 1527. As the head of the Sisodia clan, he possessed the highest ritual status of all the Rajput kings and chieftains in India. Unless Udai Singh was reduced to submission, the imperial authority of the Mughals would be lessened in Rajput eyes. Furthermore, Akbar, at this early period, was still enthusiastically devoted to the cause of Islam and sought to impress the superiority of his faith over the most prestigious warriors in Hinduism.

In 1567, Akbar moved to reduce the Chittor Fort in Mewar. The fortress-capital of Mewar was of great strategic importance as it lay on the shortest route from Agra to Gujarat and was also considered a key to holding the interior parts of Rajputana. Udai Singh retired to the hills of Mewar, leaving two Rajput warriors, Jaimal and Patta, in charge of the defence of his capital. Chittorgarh fell in February 1568 after a siege of four months. The fall of Chittor was proclaimed by Akbar as "the victory of Islam over infidels (non-Muslims)." In his Fathnama (dispatches announcing victory) issued on 9 March 1575 conveying his news of victory it is written:

Akbar had the surviving defenders and 30,000 non-combatants massacred and their heads displayed upon towers erected throughout the region, in order to demonstrate his authority. The booty that fell into the hands of the Mughals was distributed throughout the empire. He remained in Chittorgarh for three days, then returned to Agra, where to commemorate the victory, he set up, at the gates of his fort, statues of Jaimal and Patta mounted on elephants. Udai Singh's power and influence was broken. He never again ventured out of his mountain refuge in Mewar and Akbar was content to let him be.

The fall of Chittorgarh was followed up by a Mughal attack on the Ranthambore Fort in 1568. Ranthambore was held by the Hada Rajputs and reputed to be the most powerful fortress in India. However, it fell only after a couple of months. Akbar was now the master of almost the whole of Rajputana. Most of the Rajput kings had submitted to the Mughals. Only the clans of Mewar continued to resist. Udai Singh's son and successor, Pratap Singh, was later defeated by the Mughals at the Battle of Haldighati in 1576. Akbar would celebrate his conquest of Rajputana by laying the foundation of a new capital,  W.S.W of Agra in 1569. It was called Fatehpur Sikri ("the city of victory"). Rana Pratap Singh, however, continuously attacked Mughals and was able to retain most of the kingdom of his ancestors in the life of Akbar.

Annexation of Western and Eastern India

Akbar's next military objectives were the conquest of Gujarat and Bengal, which connected India with the trading centres of Asia, Africa, and Europe through the Arabian Sea and the Bay of Bengal respectively. Furthermore, Gujarat had been a haven for rebellious Mughal nobles, while in Bengal, the Afghans still held considerable influence under their ruler, Sulaiman Khan Karrani. Akbar first moved against Gujarat, which lay in the crook of the Mughal provinces of Rajputana and Malwa. Gujarat, with its coastal regions, possessed areas of rich agricultural production in its central plain, an impressive output of textiles and other industrial goods, and the busiest seaports of India. Akbar intended to link the maritime state with the massive resources of the Indo-Gangetic plains. However, the ostensible casus belli was that the rebel Mirzas, who had previously been driven out of India, were now operating out of a base in southern Gujarat. Moreover, Akbar had received invitations from cliques in Gujarat to oust the reigning king, which served as justification for his military expedition. In 1572, he moved to occupy Ahmedabad, the capital, and other northern cities, and was proclaimed the lawful sovereign of Gujarat. By 1573, he had driven out the Mirzas who, after offering token resistance, fled for refuge in the Deccan. Surat, the commercial capital of the region, and other coastal cities soon capitulated to the Mughals. The king, Muzaffar Shah III, was caught hiding in a corn field; he was pensioned off by Akbar with a small allowance.

Having established his authority over Gujarat, Akbar returned to Fatehpur Sikiri, where he built the Buland Darwaza to commemorate his victories, but a rebellion by Afghan nobles supported by the Rajput ruler of Idar, and the renewed intrigues of the Mirzas forced his return to Gujarat. Akbar crossed the Rajputana and reached Ahmedabad in eleven days – a journey that normally took six weeks. The outnumbered Mughal army then won a decisive victory on September 2, 1573. Akbar slew the rebel leaders and erected a tower out of their severed heads. The conquest and subjugation of Gujarat proved highly profitable for the Mughals; the territory yielded a revenue of more than five million rupees annually to Akbar's treasury, after expenses.

Akbar had now defeated most of the Afghan remnants in India. The only centre of Afghan power was now in Bengal, where Sulaiman Khan Karrani, an Afghan chieftain whose family had served under Sher Shah Suri, was reigning in power. While Sulaiman Khan scrupulously avoided giving offence to Akbar, his son, Daud Khan, who had succeeded him in 1572, decided otherwise. Whereas Sulaiman Khan had the khutba read in Akbar's name and acknowledged Mughal supremacy, Daud Khan assumed the insignia of royalty and ordered the khutba to be proclaimed in his own name in defiance of Akbar. Munim Khan, the Mughal governor of Bihar, was ordered to chastise Daud Khan, but later, Akbar himself set out to Bengal. This was an opportunity to bring the trade in the east under Mughal control. In 1574, the Mughals seized Patna from Daud Khan, who fled to Bengal. Akbar returned to Fatehpur Sikri and left his generals to finish the campaign. The Mughal army was subsequently victorious at the Battle of Tukaroi in 1575, which led to the annexation of Bengal and parts of Bihar that had been under the dominion of Daud Khan. Only Orissa was left in the hands of the Karrani dynasty as a fief of the Mughal Empire. A year later, however, Daud Khan rebelled and attempted to regain Bengal. He was defeated by the Mughal general, Khan Jahan Quli, and had to flee into exile. Daud Khan was later captured and executed by Mughal forces. His severed head was sent to Akbar, while his limbs were gibbeted at Tandah, the Mughal capital in Bengal.

Campaigns in Afghanistan and Central Asia

Following his conquests of Gujarat and Bengal, Akbar was preoccupied with domestic concerns. He did not leave Fatehpur Sikri on a military campaign until 1581, when Punjab was again invaded by his brother, Mirza Muhammad Hakim. Akbar expelled his brother to Kabul and this time pressed on, determined to end the threat from Muhammad Hakim once and for all. In contrast to the problem that his predecessors once had in getting Mughal nobles to stay on in India, the problem now was to get them to leave India. They were, according to Abul Fazl "afraid of the cold of Afghanistan." The Hindu officers, in turn, were additionally inhibited by the traditional taboo against crossing the Indus. Akbar, however, spurred them on. The soldiers were provided with pay eight months in advance. In August 1581, Akbar seized Kabul and took up residence at Babur's old citadel. He stayed there for three weeks, in the absence of his brother, who had fled into the mountains. Akbar left Kabul in the hands of his sister, Bakht-un-Nissa Begum, and returned to India. He pardoned his brother, who took up de facto charge of the Mughal administration in Kabul; Bakht-un-Nissa continued to be the official governor. A few years later, in 1585, Muhammad Hakim died and Kabul passed into the hands of Akbar once again. It was officially incorporated as a province of the Mughal Empire.

The Kabul expedition was the beginning of a long period of activity over the northern frontiers of the empire. For thirteen years, beginning in 1585, Akbar remained in the north, shifting his capital to Lahore in the Punjab while dealing with challenges from beyond the Khyber Pass. The gravest threat came from the Uzbeks, the tribe that had driven his grandfather, Babur, out of Central Asia. They had been organised under Abdullah Khan Shaybanid, a capable military chieftain who had seized Badakhshan and Balkh from Akbar's distant Timurid relatives, and whose Uzbek troops now posed a serious challenge to the northwestern frontiers of the Mughal Empire. The Afghan tribes on the border were also restless, partly on account of the hostility of the Yusufzai of Bajaur and Swat, and partly owing to the activity of a new religious leader, Bayazid, the founder of the Roshaniyya sect. The Uzbeks were also known to be subsidising Afghans.

In 1586, Akbar negotiated a pact with Abdullah Khan in which the Mughals agreed to remain neutral during the Uzbek invasion of Safavid held Khorasan. In return, Abdullah Khan agreed to refrain from supporting, subsidising, or offering refuge to the Afghan tribes hostile to the Mughals. Thus freed, Akbar began a series of campaigns to pacify the Yusufzais and other rebels. Akbar ordered Zain Khan to lead an expedition against the Afghan tribes. Raja Birbal, a renowned minister in Akbar's court, was also given military command. The expedition turned out to be a disaster, and on its retreat from the mountains, Birbal and his entourage were ambushed and killed by the Afghans at the Malandarai Pass in February 1586. Akbar immediately fielded new armies to reinvade the Yusufzai lands under the command of Raja Todar Mal. Over the next six years, the Mughals contained the Yusufzai in the mountain valleys, and forced the submission of many chiefs in Swat and Bajaur. Dozens of forts were built and occupied to secure the region. Akbar's response demonstrated his ability to clamp firm military control over the Afghan tribes.

Despite his pact with the Uzbeks, Akbar nurtured a secret hope of reconquering Central Asia from today's Afghanistan. However, Badakshan and Balkh remained firmly part of the Uzbek dominions. There was only a transient occupation of the two provinces by the Mughals under his grandson, Shah Jahan, in the mid-17th century. Nevertheless, Akbar's stay in the northern frontiers was highly fruitful. The last of the rebellious Afghan tribes were subdued by 1600. The Roshaniyya movement was firmly suppressed. The Afridi and Orakzai tribes, which had risen up under the Roshaniyyas, had been subjugated. The leaders of the movement were captured and driven into exile. Jalaluddin, the son of the Roshaniyya movement's founder, Bayazid, was killed in 1601 in a fight with Mughal troops near Ghazni. Mughal rule over today's Afghanistan was finally secure, particularly after the passing of the Uzbek threat with the death of Abdullah Khan in 1598.

Conquests in the Indus Valley
While in Lahore dealing with the Uzbeks, Akbar had sought to subjugate the Indus valley to secure the frontier provinces. He sent an army to conquer Kashmir in the upper Indus basin when, in 1585, Ali Shah, the reigning king of the Shia Chak dynasty, refused to send his son as a hostage to the Mughal court. Ali Shah surrendered immediately to the Mughals, but another of his sons, Yaqub, crowned himself as king, and led a stubborn resistance against the Mughal armies. Finally, in June, 1589, Akbar himself travelled from Lahore to Srinagar to receive the surrender of Yaqub and his rebel forces. Baltistan and Ladakh, which were Tibetan provinces adjacent to Kashmir, pledged their allegiance to Akbar. The Mughals also moved to conquer Sindh in the lower Indus valley. Since 1574, the northern fortress of Bhakkar had remained under imperial control. Now, in 1586, the Mughal governor of Multan tried and failed to secure the capitulation of Mirza Jani Beg, the independent ruler of Thatta in southern Sindh. Akbar responded by sending a Mughal army to besiege Sehwan, the river capital of the region. Jani Beg mustered a large army to meet the Mughals. The outnumbered Mughal forces defeated the Sindhi forces at the Battle of Sehwan. After suffering further defeats, Jani Beg surrendered to the Mughals in 1591, and in 1593, paid homage to Akbar in Lahore.

Subjugation of parts of Baluchistan
As early as 1586, about half a dozen Baluchi chiefs, under nominal Pani Afghan rule, had been persuaded to subordinate themselves to Akbar. In preparations to take Kandahar from the Safavids, Akbar ordered the Mughal forces to conquer the rest of the Afghan held parts of Baluchistan in 1595. The Mughal general, Mir Masum, led an attack on the stronghold of Sibi, northeast of Quetta and defeated a coalition of local chieftains in battle. They were made to acknowledge Mughal supremacy and attend Akbar's court. As a result, the modern-day Pakistani and Afghan parts of Baluchistan, including the Makran coast, became a part of the Mughal Empire.

Safavids and Kandahar
Kandahar was the name given by Arab historians to the ancient Indian kingdom of Gandhara. It was intimately connected with the Mughals since the time of their ancestor, Timur, the warlord who had conquered much of Western, Central, and parts of South Asia in the 14th century. However, the Safavids considered it as an appanage of the Persian-ruled territory of Khorasan and declared its association with the Mughal emperors to be a usurpation. In 1558, while Akbar was consolidating his rule over northern India, the Safavid emperor, Tahmasp I, had seized Kandahar and expelled its Mughal governor. For the next thirty years, it remained under Persian rule. The recovery of Kandahar had not been a priority for Akbar, but after his prolonged military activity in the northern frontiers, a move to restore Mughal rule over the region became desirable. The conquests of Sindh, Kashmir, and parts of Baluchistan, and the ongoing consolidation of Mughal power over today's Afghanistan had added to Akbar's confidence. Furthermore, Kandahar was at this time under threat from the Uzbeks, but the Emperor of Persia, himself beleaguered by the Ottoman Turks, was unable to send any reinforcements. Circumstances favoured the Mughals.

In 1593, Akbar received the exiled Safavid prince, Rostam Mirza, after he had quarreled with his family. Rostam Mirza pledged allegiance to the Mughals; he was granted a rank (mansab) of commander of 5000 men and received Multan as a jagir. Beleaguered by constant Uzbek raids, and seeing the reception of Rostom Mirza at the Mughal court, the Safavid prince and governor of Kandahar, Mozaffar Hosayn, also agreed to defect to the Mughals. Mozaffar Hosayn, who was in any case in an adversary relationship with his overlord, Shah Abbas, was granted a rank of 5000 men, and his daughter Kandahari Begum was married to Akbar's grandson, the Mughal prince, Khurram. Kandahar was finally secured in 1595 with the arrival of a garrison headed by the Mughal general, Shah Bayg Khan. The reconquest of Kandahar did not overtly disturb the Mughal-Persian relationship. Akbar and the Persian Shah continued to exchange ambassadors and presents. However, the power equation between the two had now changed in favour of the Mughals.

Deccan Sultans

In 1593, Akbar began military operations against the Deccan Sultans who had not submitted to his authority. He besieged Ahmednagar Fort in 1595, forcing Chand Bibi to cede Berar. A subsequent revolt forced Akbar to take the fort in August 1600. Akbar occupied Burhanpur and besieged Asirgarh Fort in 1599, and took it on 17 January 1601, when Miran Bahadur Shah refused to submit Khandesh. Akbar then established the Subahs of Ahmadnagar, Berar, and Khandesh under Prince Daniyal. "By the time of his death in 1605, Akbar controlled a broad sweep of territory from the Bay of Bengal to Qandahar and Badakshan. He touched the western sea in Sind and at Surat and was well astride central India."

Administration

Political government
Akbar's system of central government was based on the system that had evolved since the Delhi Sultanate, but the functions of various departments were carefully reorganised by laying down detailed regulations for their functioning
 The revenue department was headed by a wazir, responsible for all finances and management of jagir and inam lands.
 The head of the military was called the mir bakshi, appointed from among the leading nobles of the court. The mir bakshi was in charge of intelligence gathering, and also made recommendations to the emperor for military appointments and promotions.
 The mir saman was in charge of the imperial household, including the harems, and supervised the functioning of the court and royal bodyguard.
 The judiciary was a separate organisation headed by a chief qazi, who was also responsible for religious beliefs and practices

Taxation
Akbar set about reforming the administration of his empire's land revenue by adopting a system that had been used by Sher Shah Suri. A cultivated area where crops grew well was measured and taxed through fixed rates based on the area's crop and productivity. However, this placed hardship on the peasantry because tax rates were fixed on the basis of prices prevailing in the imperial court, which were often higher than those in the countryside. Under the new system, revenue was calculated as one-third of the average produce of the previous ten years, to be paid to the state in cash. This system was later refined, taking into account local prices, and grouping areas with similar productivity into assessment circles. Remission was given to peasants when the harvest failed during times of flood or drought. Akbar's  system (also known as ) is credited to Raja Todar Mal, who also served as a revenue officer under Sher Shah Suri, and the structure of the revenue administration was set out by the latter in a detailed memorandum submitted to the emperor in 1582–83.

Other local methods of assessment continued in some areas. Land which was fallow or uncultivated was charged at concessional rates. Akbar also actively encouraged the improvement and extension of agriculture. The village continued to remain the primary unit of revenue assessment. Zamindars of every area were required to provide loans and agricultural implements in times of need, to encourage farmers to plough as much land as possible and to sow seeds of superior quality. In turn, the zamindars were given a hereditary right to collect a share of the produce. Peasants had a hereditary right to cultivate the land as long as they paid the land revenue. While the revenue assessment system showed concern for the small peasantry, it also maintained a level of distrust towards the revenue officials. Revenue officials were guaranteed only three-quarters of their salary, with the remaining quarter dependent on their full realisation of the revenue assessed.

Military organization

Akbar organised his army as well as the nobility by means of a system called the mansabdari. Under this system, each officer in the army was assigned a rank (a mansabdar), and assigned a number of cavalry that he had to supply to the imperial army. The mansabdars were divided into 33 classes. The top three commanding ranks, ranging from 7,000 to 10,000 troops, were normally reserved for princes. Other ranks between 10 and 5,000 were assigned to other members of the nobility. The empire's permanent standing army was quite small and the imperial forces mostly consisted of contingents maintained by the mansabdars. Persons were normally appointed to a low mansab and then promoted, based on their merit as well as the favour of the emperor. Each mansabdar was required to maintain a certain number of cavalrymen and twice that number of horses. The number of horses was greater because they had to be rested and rapidly replaced in times of war. Akbar employed strict measures to ensure that the quality of the armed forces was maintained at a high level; horses were regularly inspected and only Arabian horses were normally employed. The mansabdars were remunerated well for their services and constituted the highest paid military service in the world at the time.

Capital

Akbar was a follower of Salim Chishti, a holy man who lived in the region of Sikri near Agra. Believing the area to be a lucky one for himself, he had a mosque constructed there for the use of the priest. Palace for Akbar's favorite queen, a huge artificial lake, and sumptuous water-filled courtyards were built there. However, the city was soon abandoned and the capital was moved to Lahore in 1585. The reason may have been that the water supply in Fatehpur Sikri was insufficient or of poor quality. Or, as some historians believe, Akbar had to attend to the northwest areas of his empire and therefore moved his capital northwest. Other sources indicate Akbar simply lost interest in the city or realised it was not militarily defensible. In 1599, Akbar shifted his capital back to Agra from where he reigned until his death.

Economy

Trade
The reign of Akbar was characterized by commercial expansion. The Mughal government encouraged traders, provided protection and security for transactions, and levied a very low custom duty to stimulate foreign trade. Furthermore, it strived to foster a climate conducive to commerce by requiring local administrators to provide restitution to traders for goods stolen while in their territory. To minimize such incidents, bands of highway police called  were enlisted to patrol roads and ensure the safety of traders. Other active measures taken included the construction and protection of routes of commerce and communications. Indeed, Akbar would make concerted efforts to improve roads to facilitate the use of wheeled vehicles through the Khyber Pass, the most popular route frequented by traders and travelers journeying from Kabul into Mughal India. He also strategically occupied the northwestern cities of Multan and Lahore in the Punjab and constructed great forts, such as the one at Attock near the crossing of the Grand Trunk Road and the Indus river, as well as a network of smaller forts called thanas throughout the frontier to secure the overland trade with Persia and Central Asia. Furthermore, he established a trade business for his chief consort, Mariam-uz-Zamani who ran an extensive trade of indigo, spices, and cotton to Gulf nations through merchant's vessels.

Coins

Akbar was a great innovator as far as coinage is concerned. The coins of Akbar set a new chapter in India's numismatic history. The coins of Akbar's grandfather, Babur, and father, Humayun, are basic and devoid of any innovation as the former was busy establishing the foundations of the Mughal rule in India while the latter was ousted by the Afghan, Sher Shah Suri, and returned to the throne only to die a year later. While the reign of both Babur and Humayun represented turmoil, Akbar's relative long reign of 50 years allowed him to experiment with coinage.

Akbar introduced coins with decorative floral motifs, dotted borders, quatrefoil, and other types. His coins were both round and square in shape with a unique 'mehrab' (lozenge) shape coin highlighting numismatic calligraphy at its best. Akbar's portrait type gold coin (Mohur) is generally attributed to his son, Prince Salim (later Emperor Jahangir), who had rebelled and then sought reconciliation thereafter by minting and presenting his father with gold Mohurs bearing Akbar's portrait. The tolerant view of Akbar is represented by the 'Ram-Sita' silver coin type while during the latter part of Akbar's reign, we see coins portraying the concept of Akbar's newly promoted religion 'Din-e-ilahi' with the Ilahi type and Jalla Jalal-Hu type coins.

The coins, left, represent examples of these innovative concepts introduced by Akbar that set the precedent for Mughal coins which was refined and perfected by his son, Jahangir, and later by his grandson, Shah Jahan.

Diplomacy

Matrimonial alliances
The practice of arranging marriages between Hindu princesses and Muslim kings was known much before Akbar's time, but in most cases, these marriages did not lead to any stable relations between the families involved, and the women were lost to their families and did not return after marriage.

However, Akbar's policy of matrimonial alliances marked a departure in India from previous practice in that the marriage itself marked the beginning of a new order of relations, wherein the Hindu Rajputs who married their daughters or sisters to him would be treated on par with his Muslim fathers-in-law and brothers-in-law in all respects except being able to dine and pray with him or take Muslim wives. These Rajputs were made members of his court and their daughters' or sisters' marriage to a Muslim ceased to be a sign of degradation, except for certain proud elements who still considered it a sign of humiliation.

The Kacchwaha Rajput, Raja Bharmal, of the small kingdom of Amer, who had come to Akbar's court shortly after the latter's accession, allied by giving his daughter Harka Bai, mother of Akbar's successor, in marriage to the emperor. Bharmal was made a noble of high rank in the imperial court, and subsequently, his son Bhagwant Das and grandson Man Singh also rose to high ranks in the nobility.

Other Rajput kingdoms also established matrimonial alliances with Akbar, but matrimony was not insisted on as a precondition for forming alliances. Two major Rajput clans remained aloof – the Sisodiyas of Mewar and Hadas of Ranthambore. In another turning point of Akbar's reign, Raja Man Singh I of Amber went with Akbar to meet the Hada leader, Surjan Hada, to effect an alliance. Surjan accepted an alliance on the condition that Akbar did not marry any of his daughters. Consequently, no matrimonial alliance was entered into, yet Surjan was made a noble and placed in charge of Garh-Katanga.

The political effect of these alliances was significant. While some Rajput women who entered Akbar's harem converted to Islam, they were generally provided full religious freedom, and their relatives, who continued to remain Hindu, formed a significant part of the nobility and served to articulate the opinions of the majority of the common populace in the imperial court. The interaction between Hindu and Muslim nobles in the imperial court resulted in an exchange of thoughts and blending of the two cultures. Further, newer generations of the Mughal line represented a merger of Mughal and Rajput blood, thereby strengthening ties between the two. As a result, the Rajputs became the strongest allies of the Mughals, and Rajput soldiers and generals fought for the Mughal army under Akbar, leading it in several campaigns including the conquest of Gujarat in 1572. Akbar's policy of religious tolerance ensured that employment in the imperial administration was open to all on merit irrespective of creed, and this led to an increase in the strength of the administrative services of the empire.

Another legend is that Akbar's daughter Meherunnissa was enamored by Tansen and had a role in his coming to Akbar's court. Tansen converted to Islam from Hinduism, apparently on the eve of his marriage with Akbar's daughter.

Foreign relations

Relations with the Portuguese

At the time of Akbar's ascension in 1556, the Portuguese had established several fortresses and factories on the western coast of the subcontinent, and largely controlled navigation and sea trade in that region. As a consequence of this colonialism, all other trading entities were subject to the terms and conditions of the Portuguese, and this was resented by the rulers and traders of the time including Bahadur Shah of Gujarat.

In the year 1572 the Mughal Empire annexed Gujarat and acquired its first access to the sea after local officials informed Akbar that the Portuguese had begun to exert control in the Indian Ocean. Hence Akbar was conscious of the threat posed by the presence of the Portuguese and remained content with obtaining a cartaz (permit) from them for sailing in the Persian Gulf region. At the initial meeting of the Mughals and the Portuguese during the Siege of Surat in 1572, the Portuguese, recognizing the superior strength of the Mughal army, chose to adopt diplomacy instead of war. The Portuguese Governor, upon the request of Akbar, sent him an ambassador to establish friendly relations. Akbar's efforts to purchase and secure from the Portuguese some of their compact artillery pieces were unsuccessful and thus Akbar could not establish the Mughal navy along the Gujarat coast.

Akbar accepted the offer of diplomacy, but the Portuguese continually asserted their authority and power in the Indian Ocean; Akbar was highly concerned when he had to request a permit from the Portuguese before any ships from the Mughal Empire were to depart for the Hajj pilgrimage to Mecca and Medina. In 1573, he issued a firman directing Mughal administrative officials in Gujarat not to provoke the Portuguese in the territory they held in Daman. The Portuguese, in turn, issued passes for the members of Akbar's family to go on Hajj to Mecca. The Portuguese made mention of the extraordinary status of the vessel and the special status to be accorded to its occupants. Furthermore, he established a trade business for his favourite consort, Mariam-uz-Zamani who ran an extensive trade of indigo, spices, and cotton to the Gulf nations through merchant's vessels. The cost of her largest ship named 'Rahimi', built on the orders of Akbar, is estimated to be around 300,000 pounds (Rs 3 crores approximately).

In September 1579, Jesuits from Goa were invited to visit the court of Akbar. The emperor had his scribes translate the New Testament and granted the Jesuits the freedom to preach the Gospel. One of his sons, Sultan Murad Mirza, was entrusted to Antoni de Montserrat for his education. While debating at court, the Jesuits did not confine themselves to the exposition of their own beliefs but also reviled Islam and Muhammad. Their comments enraged the Imams and Ulama, who objected to the remarks, but Akbar ordered their comments to be recorded and observed the Jesuits and their behaviour. This event was followed by a rebellion of Muslim clerics in 1581 led by Mullah Muhammad Yazdi and Muiz-ul-Mulk, the chief Qadi of Bengal; the rebels wanted to overthrow Akbar and insert his brother Mirza Muhammad Hakim, ruler of Kabul, on the Mughal throne. Akbar successfully defeated the rebels, but he had grown more cautious about his guests and his proclamations, which he later checked with his advisers carefully.

Relations with the Ottoman Empire

In 1555, while Akbar was still a child, the Ottoman Admiral Seydi Ali Reis visited the Mughal Emperor Humayun. In 1569, during the early years of Akbar's rule, another Ottoman Admiral Kurtoğlu Hızır Reis arrived on the shores of the Mughal Empire. These Ottoman admirals sought to end the growing threats of the Portuguese Empire during their Indian Ocean campaigns. During his reign Akbar himself is known to have sent six documents addressing the Ottoman Sultan Suleiman the Magnificent.

In 1576, Akbar sent a contingent of pilgrims on Hajj, led by Khwaja Sultan Naqshbandi, with 600,000 rupees and 12,000 khalats (honorific robes) for the needy of Mecca and Medina. In October 1576, Akbar sent a delegation including members of his family, including his aunt Gulbadan Begum and his consort Salima, on Hajj by two ships from Surat including an Ottoman vessel, which reached the port of Jeddah in 1577 and then proceeded towards Mecca and Medina. Four more caravans were sent from 1577 to 1580, with exquisite gifts for the authorities of Mecca and Medina.

During this period Akbar financed the pilgrimages of many poor Muslims from the Mughal Empire and also funded the foundations of the Qadiriyya Sufi Order's dervish lodge in the Hijaz. Because of Akbar's attempts to build Mughal presence in Mecca and Medina, the local Sharifs began to have more confidence in the financial support provided by Mughal Empire, lessening their dependency upon Ottoman bounty. Mughal-Ottoman trade also flourished during this period – in fact, merchants loyal to Akbar are known to have reached Aleppo after journeying upriver through the port of Basra. 

The imperial Mughal entourage stayed in Mecca and Medina for nearly four years and attended the Hajj four times. The pilgrims overstayed their welcome and strained the limited resources of these cities. The Ottoman authorities forced them to return to India in 1582. Historian Naimur Rahman Farooqi wrote that their unceremonious expulsion may explain why Akbar broke relations with the Hijaz and stopped sending Hajj caravans after 1581.

According to some accounts Akbar expressed a desire to form an alliance with the Portuguese against the Ottomans, but nothing came of the idea.

Relations with the Safavid dynasty

The Safavids and the Mughals had a long history of diplomatic relationship, with the Safavid ruler Tahmasp I having provided refuge to Humayun when he had to flee the Indian subcontinent following his defeat by Sher Shah Suri. However, the Safavids differed from the Sunni Mughals and Ottomans in following the Shiite sect of Islam. One of the longest standing disputes between the Safavids and the Mughals pertained to the control of the city of Qandahar in the Hindukush region, which formed the border between the two empires. The Hindukush region was militarily very significant owing to its geography, and this was well-recognised by strategists of the times. The city, which was being administered by Bairam Khan at the time of Akbar's accession, was invaded and captured by the Persian ruler Husain Mirza, a cousin of Tahmasp I, in 1558. Shortly afterwards, Akbar's army completed its annexation of Kabul, and in order to further secure the north-western boundaries of his empire, it proceeded to Qandahar. The city capitulated without resistance on 18 April 1595, and the ruler Muzaffar Hussain moved into Akbar's court. ubsequent to this, Bairam Khan sent an envoy to the court of Tahmasp I in an effort to maintain peaceful relations with the Safavids. This gesture was reciprocated and a cordial relationship prevailed between the two empires during the remainder of the first two decades of Akbar's reign. However, the death of Tahmasp I in 1576 resulted in civil war and instability in the Safavid empire, and diplomatic relations between the two empires ceased for more than a decade. They were restored only in 1587 following the accession of Shah Abbas to the Safavid throne. Diplomatic relations continued to be maintained between the Safavid and Mughal courts until the end of Akbar's reign. Qandahar continued to remain in Mughal possession, and the Hindukush the empire's western frontier, for several decades until Shah Jahan's expedition into Badakhshan in 1646.

Relations with other contemporary kingdoms
Vincent Arthur Smith observes that the merchant Mildenhall was employed in 1600 while the establishment of the company was under adjustment to bear a letter from Queen Elizabeth to Akbar requesting liberty to trade in his dominions on terms as good as those enjoyed by the Portuguese.

Akbar was also visited by the French explorer Pierre Malherbe.

Religious policy

Akbar, as well as his mother and other members of his family, are believed to have been Sunni Hanafi Muslims. His early days were spent in the backdrop of an atmosphere in which liberal sentiments were encouraged and religious narrow-mindedness was frowned upon. From the 15th century, a number of rulers in various parts of the country adopted a more liberal policy of religious tolerance, attempting to foster communal harmony between Hindus and Muslims. These sentiments were earlier encouraged by the teachings of popular saints like Guru Nanak, Kabir, and Chaitanya, the verses of the Persian poet Hafez which advocated human sympathy and a liberal outlook, as well as the Timurid ethos of religious tolerance in the empire, persisted in the polity right from the times of Timur to Humayun, and influenced Akbar's policy of tolerance in matters of religion. Further, his childhood tutors, who included two Irani Shias, were largely above sectarian prejudices, and made a significant contribution to Akbar's later inclination towards religious tolerance.

Akbar sponsored religious debates between different Muslim groups (Sunni, Shia, Ismaili, and Sufis), Parsis, Hindus (Shaivite and Vaishnava), Sikhs, Jains, Jews, Jesuits, and Materialists, but was partial to Sufism; he proclaimed that 'the wisdom of Vedanta is the wisdom of Sufism'.

Association with the Muslim aristocracy

During the early part of his reign, Akbar adopted an attitude of suppression towards Muslim sects that were condemned by the orthodoxy as heretical. In 1567, on the advice of Shaikh Abdu'n Nabi, he ordered the exhumation of Mir Murtaza Sharifi Shirazi – a Shia buried in Delhi – because of the grave's proximity to that of Amir Khusrau, arguing that a "heretic" could not be buried so close to the grave of a Sunni saint, reflecting a restrictive attitude towards the Shia, which continued to persist until the early 1570s. He suppressed Mahdavism in 1573 during his campaign in Gujarat, in the course of which the Mahdavi leader Bandagi Miyan Sheik Mustafa was arrested and brought in chains to the court for debate and released after eighteen months. However, as Akbar increasingly came under the influence of pantheistic Sufi mysticism from the early 1570s, it caused a great shift in his outlook and culminated in his shift from orthodox Islam as traditionally professed, in favour of a new concept of Islam transcending the limits of religion. Consequently, during the latter half of his reign, he adopted a policy of tolerance towards the Shias and declared a prohibition on Shia-Sunni conflict, and the empire remained neutral in matters of internal sectarian conflict. In the year 1578, the Mughal Emperor Akbar famously referred to himself as:

In 1580, a rebellion broke out in the eastern part of Akbar's empire, and a number of fatwas, declaring Akbar to be a heretic, were issued by Qazis. Akbar suppressed the rebellion and handed out severe punishments to the Qazis. To further strengthen his position in dealing with the Qazis, Akbar issued a mazhar, or declaration, that was signed by all major ulemas in 1579. The mahzar asserted that Akbar was the Khalifa of the age, a higher rank than that of a Mujtahid: in case of a difference of opinion among the Mujtahids, Akbar could select any one opinion and could also issue decrees that did not go against the nass. Given the prevailing Islamic sectarian conflicts in various parts of the country at that time, it is believed that the Mazhar helped stabilize the religious situation in the empire. It made Akbar very powerful because of the complete supremacy accorded to the Khalifa by Islam, and also helped him eliminate the religious and political influence of the Ottoman Khalifa over his subjects, thus ensuring their complete loyalty to him.

Throughout his reign Akbar was a patron of influential Muslim scholars such as Mir Ahmed Nasrallah Thattvi and Tahir Muhammad Thattvi.

Whenever Akbar would attend congregations at a mosque, the following proclamation was made:

Din-i Ilahi

Akbar was deeply interested in religious and philosophical matters. An orthodox Muslim at the outset, he later came to be influenced by Sufi mysticism that was being preached in the country at that time, and moved away from orthodoxy, appointing to his court several talented people with liberal ideas, including Abul Fazl, Faizi, and Birbal. In 1575, he built a hall called the Ibadat Khana ("House of Worship") at Fatehpur Sikri, to which he invited theologians, mystics, and selected courtiers renowned for their intellectual achievements and discussed matters of spirituality with them. These discussions, initially restricted to Muslims, were acrimonious and resulted in the participants shouting at and abusing each other. Upset by this, Akbar opened the Ibadat Khana to people of all religions as well as atheists, resulting in the scope of the discussions broadening and extending even into areas such as the validity of the Quran and the nature of God. This shocked the orthodox theologians, who sought to discredit Akbar by circulating rumours of his desire to forsake Islam.

Akbar's effort to evolve a meeting point among the representatives of various religions was not very successful, as each of them attempted to assert the superiority of their respective religions by denouncing other religions. Meanwhile, the debates at the Ibadat Khana grew more acrimonious and, contrary to their purpose of leading to a better understanding among religions, instead led to greater bitterness among them, resulting in the discontinuance of the debates by Akbar in 1582. However, his interaction with various religious theologians had convinced him that despite their differences, all religions had several good practices, which he sought to combine into a new religious movement known as Din-i-Ilahi.

Some modern scholars claim that Akbar did not initiate a new religion but instead introduced what Oscar R. Gómez calls the transtheistic outlook from tantric Tibetan Buddhism, and that he did not use the word Din-i-Ilahi. According to the contemporary events in the Mughal court Akbar was indeed angered by the acts of embezzlement of wealth by many high level Muslim clerics.

Virtues in Din-i-Ilahi included generosity, forgiveness, abstinence, prudence, wisdom, kindness, and piety. Celibacy was respected, chastity enforced, the slaughter of animals was discouraged, and there were no sacred scriptures or a priestly hierarchy. However, a leading noble of Akbar's court, Aziz Koka, wrote a letter to him from Mecca in 1594 arguing that the discipleship promoted by Akbar amounted to nothing more than a desire on Akbar's part to portray his superiority regarding religious matters. To commemorate Din-e-Ilahi, he changed the name of Prayag to Allahabad (pronounced as ilahabad) in 1583.

It has been argued that the theory of Din-i-Ilahi being a new religion was a misconception that arose because of erroneous translations of Abul Fazl's work by later British historians. However, it is also accepted that the policy of sulh-e-kul, which formed the essence of Din-i-Ilahi, was adopted by Akbar not merely for religious purposes but as a part of general imperial administrative policy. This also formed the basis for Akbar's policy of religious tolerance. At the time of Akbar's death in 1605 there were no signs of discontent amongst his Muslim subjects, and the impression of even a theologian like Abdu'l Haq was that close ties remained.

Relation with Hindus

Akbar decreed that Hindus who had been forced to convert to Islam could reconvert to Hinduism without facing the death penalty. In his days of tolerance he was so well liked by Hindus that there are numerous references to him, and his eulogies are sung in songs and religious hymns as well.

Akbar practised several Hindu customs. He celebrated Diwali, allowed Brahman priests to tie jewelled strings round his wrists by way of blessing, and, following his lead, many of the nobles took to wearing rakhi (protection charms). He renounced beef and forbade the sale of all meats on certain days.

Even his son Jahangir and grandson Shahjahan maintained many of Akbar's concessions, such as the ban on cow slaughter, having only vegetarian dishes on certain days of the week, and drinking only Ganges water. Even as he was in the Punjab, 200 miles away from the Ganges, the water was sealed in large jars and transported to him. He referred to the Ganges water as the "water of immortality."

Relation with Jains

Akbar regularly held discussions with Jain scholars and was also greatly impacted by their teachings. His first encounter with Jain rituals was when he saw a procession of a Jain Shravaka named Champa after a six-month-long fast. Impressed by her power and devotion, he invited her guru, or spiritual teacher, Acharya Hiravijaya Suri to Fatehpur Sikri. Acharya accepted the invitation and began his march towards the Mughal capital from Gujarat.

Akbar was impressed by the scholastic qualities and character of the Acharya. He held several inter-faith dialogues among philosophers of different religions. The arguments of Jains against eating meat persuaded him to become a vegetarian. Akbar also issued many imperial orders that were favourable for Jain interests, such as banning animal slaughter. Jain authors also wrote about their experience at the Mughal court in Sanskrit texts that are still largely unknown to Mughal historians.

The Indian Supreme Court has cited examples of co-existence of Jain and Mughal architecture, calling Akbar "the architect of modern India" and that "he had great respect" for Jainism. In 1584, 1592, and 1598, Akbar had declared "Amari Ghosana", which prohibited animal slaughter during Paryushan and Mahavira Janma Kalyanak. He removed the Jazia tax from Jain pilgrim places like Palitana. Santichandra, disciple of Suri, was sent to the Emperor, who in turn left his disciples Bhanuchandra and Siddhichandra in the court. Akbar again invited Hiravijaya Suri's successor Vijayasena Suri in his court who visited him between 1593 and 1595.

Akbar's religious tolerance was not followed by his son Jahangir, who even threatened Akbar's former friend Bhanuchandra.

Historical accounts

Personality

Akbar's reign was chronicled extensively by his court historian Abul Fazl in the books Akbarnama and Ain-i-akbari. Other contemporary sources of Akbar's reign include the works of Badayuni, Shaikhzada Rashidi, and Shaikh Ahmed Sirhindi.

Akbar was a warrior, emperor, general, animal trainer (reputedly keeping thousands of hunting cheetahs during his reign and training many himself), and theologian. Believed to be dyslexic, he was read to every day and had a remarkable memory.

Akbar was said to have been a wise emperor and a sound judge of character. His son and heir, Jahangir, wrote effusive praise of Akbar's character in his memoirs, and dozens of anecdotes to illustrate his virtues. According to Jahangir, Akbar was "of the hue of wheat; his eyes and eyebrows were black, and his complexion rather dark than fair". Antoni de Montserrat, the Catalan Jesuit who visited his court described him as follows:

Akbar was not tall but powerfully built and very agile. He was also noted for various acts of courage. One such incident occurred on his way back from Malwa to Agra when Akbar was 19 years of age. Akbar rode alone in advance of his escort and was confronted by a tigress who, along with her cubs, came out from the shrubbery across his path. When the tigress charged the emperor, he was alleged to have dispatched the animal with his sword in a solitary blow. His approaching attendants found the emperor standing quietly by the side of the dead animal.

Abul Fazl, and even the hostile critic Badayuni, described him as having a commanding personality. He was notable for his command in battle, and, "like Alexander of Macedon, was always ready to risk his life, regardless of political consequences". He often plunged on his horse into the flooded river during the rainy seasons and safely crossed it. He rarely indulged in cruelty and is said to have been affectionate towards his relatives. He pardoned his brother Hakim, who was a repented rebel. But on rare occasions, he dealt cruelly with offenders, such as his maternal uncle Muazzam and his foster-brother Adham Khan, who was twice defenestrated for drawing Akbar's wrath.

He is said to have been extremely moderate in his diet. Ain-e-Akbari mentions that during his travels and also while at home, Akbar drank water from the Ganges river, which he called 'the water of immortality'. Special people were stationed at Sorun and later Haridwar to dispatch water, in sealed jars, to wherever he was stationed. According to Jahangir's memoirs, he was fond of fruits and had little liking for meat, which he stopped eating in his later years.

Akbar also once visited Vrindavan, regarded as the birthplace of Krishna, in the year 1570, and gave permission for four temples to be built by the Gaudiya Vaishnavas, which were Madana-mohana, Govindaji, Gopinatha, and Jugal Kisore.

To defend his stance that speech arose from hearing, he carried out a language deprivation experiment, and had children raised in isolation, not allowed to be spoken to, and pointed out that as they grew older, they remained mute.

Hagiography
During Akbar's reign, the ongoing process of inter-religious discourse and syncretism resulted in a series of religious attributions to him in terms of positions of assimilation, doubt or uncertainty, which he either assisted himself or left unchallenged. Such hagiographical accounts of Akbar traversed a wide range of denominational and sectarian spaces, including several accounts by Parsis, Jains, and Jesuit missionaries, apart from contemporary accounts by Brahminical and Muslim orthodoxy. Existing sects and denominations, as well as various religious figures who represented popular worship felt they had a claim to him. The diversity of these accounts is attributed to the fact that his reign resulted in the formation of a flexible centralised state accompanied by personal authority and cultural heterogeneity.

Akbarnāma, the Book of Akbar

The , which literally means Book of Akbar, is an official biographical account of Akbar written in Persian. It includes vivid and detailed descriptions of his life and times. The work was commissioned by Akbar, and written by Abul Fazl, one of the Nine Jewels (Hindi: Navaratnas) of Akbar's royal court. It is stated that the book took seven years to be completed and the original manuscripts contained a number of paintings supporting the texts, and all the paintings represented the Mughal school of painting, and work of masters of the imperial workshop, including Basawan, whose use of portraiture in its illustrations was an innovation in Indian art.

Consorts and concubines
Akbar's first wife and one of the chief consorts was his cousin, Princess Ruqaiya Sultan Begum, the only daughter of his paternal uncle, Prince Hindal Mirza, and his wife Sultanam Begum. In 1551, Hindal Mirza died fighting valorously in a battle against Kamran Mirza's forces. Upon hearing the news of his brother's death, Humayun was overwhelmed with grief. Hindal's daughter Ruqaiya married Akbar about the time of his first appointment, at age nine, as governor of Ghazni Province. Humayun conferred on the imperial couple, all the wealth, army, and adherents of Hindal and Ghazni which one of Hindal's jagir was given to his nephew, Akbar, who was appointed as its viceroy and was also given the command of his uncle's army. Akbar's marriage with Ruqaiya was solemnized near Jalandhar, Punjab, when both of them were 14 years old. She was a senior-ranking wife of Akbar. She died childless in January 1626 and was buried next to her father's grave.

His second wife was the daughter of Abdullah Khan Mughal. The marriage took place in 1557 during the siege of Mankot. Bairam Khan did not approve of this marriage, for Abdullah's sister was married to Akbar's uncle, Prince Kamran Mirza, and so he regarded Abdullah as a partisan of Kamran. He opposed the match until Nasir-al-Mulk made him understand that opposition in such matters was unacceptable. Nasir-al-Mulk arranged an assemblage of pleasure and banquet of joy, and a royal feast was provided.

His third wife and one of his three chief consorts was his cousin, Salima Sultan Begum, the daughter of Nur-ud-din Muhammad Mirza and his wife Gulrukh Begum also known as Gulrang, the daughter of Emperor Babur. She was at first betrothed to Bairam Khan by Humayun. After Bairam Khan died in 1561, Akbar married her in the same year. She was the foster mother of Akbar's second son, Murad Mirza. She held a great influence on Akbar. She was a poetess and was regarded as a remarkable woman being a poetess, lover of books, and actively played a role in the politics of the Mughal court during Akbar's and Jahangir's reigns. She is regarded as the senior-most wife of Akbar. She died childless on 2 January 1613.

Akbar's fourth and favourite wife  was the Mariam-uz-Zamani, commonly known by the misnomer Jodha Bai, whom he married in the year 1562. She was the daughter of the ruler of Amer, Raja Bharmal, and was by birth of Rajput caste. She was his fourth wife and became one of his chief consorts. She gradually became his most influential wife and subsequently is the only wife buried close to him. She was bestowed with the name 'Wali Nimat Begum' (Blessings/Gift of God) by Akbar shortly after her marriage. She was a beautiful woman said to possess uncommon beauty. This marriage took place when Akbar was on his way back from Ajmer after offering prayers to the tomb of Moinuddin Chishti. Raja Bharmal had conveyed to Akbar that he was being harassed by his brother-in-law Sharif-ud-din Mirza (the Mughal hakim of Mewat). Akbar insisted that the Raja should submit to him personally; it was also suggested that his daughter should be married to him as a sign of complete submission. Her marriage is considered one of the most important events of the Mughal Empire. She became his first wife to honour the royal mansion with an heir. In the year 1564, she gave birth to twins named Mirza Hassan and Mirza Hussain. In the year 1569, she was honoured with the title of 'Mariam-uz-Zamani' after giving birth to their third son named Prince Salim (the future emperor Jahangir), the heir to the throne. She was also the foster mother of Akbar's favourite son, Daniyal Mirza.

She commanded a high rank in the imperial harem and was a recipient of many privileges. She was an intellectual woman  who held a considerable influence in Akbar's court and is known as the prime driving force for Akbar's promotion of secularism and religious neutrality. She was a smart woman who established international trade in the Mughal Empire and is regarded as the most adventurous and fearsome businesswoman of her time. Known as a great female patron of architecture of Mughal empire, she died on 19 May 1623 in Agra and was buried close to her husband in Sikandra, Agra. 

In the year 1562, Akbar married the former wife of Abdul Wasi, the son of Shaikh Bada, lord of Agra. Akbar was enamored with her beauty, and ordered Abdul Wasi to divorce her. Another of his wives was Gauhar-un-Nissa Begum, the daughter of Shaikh Muhammad Bakhtiyar and the sister of Shaikh Jamal Bakhtiyar. Their dynasty was called Din Laqab and had been living for a long time in Chandwar and Jalesar near Agra. He married the daughter of Jagmal Rathore, son of Rao Viramde of Merta in 1562.

His next marriage took place in 1564 to the daughter of Miran Mubarak Shah, the ruler of Khandesh. In 1564, he sent presents to the court with a request that his daughter be married to Akbar. Miran's request acceded and an order was issued. Itimad Khan was sent with Miran's ambassadors, and when he came near the fort of Asir, which was Miran's residence. Miran welcomed Itimad with honor and despatched his daughter with Itimad. A large number of nobles accompanied her. The marriage took place in September 1564 when she reached Akbar's court. As a dowry, Mubarak Shah ceded Bijagarh and Handia to his imperial son-in-law.

He married another Rajput princess in 1570, Raj Kunwari, daughter of Kanha, the brother of Rai Kalyan Mal, the ruler of Bikanir. The marriage took place in 1570 when Akbar came to this part of the country. Kalyan made a homage to Akbar and requested that his brother's daughter be married to him. Akbar accepted his proposal, and the marriage was arranged. He also married Bhanmati, daughter of Bhim Raj, another brother of Rai Kalyan Mal. He also married Nathi Bai, daughter of Rawal Har Rai, the ruler of Jaisalmer in 1570. Rawal had sent a request that his daughter be married to Akbar. The proposal was accepted by Akbar. Raja Bhagwan Das was despatched on this service. The marriage ceremony took place after Akbar's return from Nagor. She was the mother of Princess Mahi Begum, who died on 8 April 1577. In 1570, Narhardas, a grandson of Rao Viramde of Merta, married his sister, Puram Bai, to Akbar in return for Akbar's support of Keshodas's claims on Merta.

Another of his wives was Bhakkari Begum, the daughter of Sultan Mahmud of Bhakkar. On 2 July 1572, Akbar's envoy I'timad Khan reached Mahmud's court to escort his daughter to Akbar. Itimad Khan brought with him for Sultan Mahmud an elegant dress of honour, a bejeweled scimitar belt, a horse with a saddle and reins, and four elephants. Mahmud celebrated the occasion by holding extravagant feasts for fifteen days. On the day of the wedding, the festivities reached their zenith, and the ulema, saints, and nobles were adequately honoured with rewards. Mahmud offered 30,000 rupees in cash and kind to Itimad Khan and farewelled his daughter with a grand dowry and an impressive entourage. She came to Ajmer and waited upon Akbar. The gifts of Sultan Mahmud, carried by the delegation were presented to the ladies of the imperial harem.

His ninth wife was Qasima Banu Begum, the daughter of Arab Shah. The marriage took place in 1575. A great feast was given, and the high officers and other pillars of the state were present. In 1577, the Rawal Askaran of Dungarpur State petitioned a request that his daughter might be married to Akbar. Akbar had regard for his loyalty and granted his request. Rai Loukaran and Rajah Birbar, servants of the Rajah were sent from Dihalpur to do the honour of conveying his daughter. The two delivered the lady to Akbar's court where the marriage took place on 12 July 1577.

His eleventh wife was Bibi Daulat Shad. She was the mother of Princess Shakr-un-Nissa Begum, and Princess Aram Banu Begum born on 22 December 1584. His next wife was the daughter of Shams Chak, a Kashmiri. The marriage took place on 3 November 1592. Shams belonged to the great men of the country and had long cherished this wish. In 1593, he married the daughter of Qazi Isa and the cousin of Najib Khan. Najib told Akbar that his uncle had made his daughter a present for him. Akbar accepted his representation and on 3 July 1593, he visited Najib Khan's house and married Qazi Isa's daughter.

At some point, Akbar took into his harem Rukmavati, a daughter of Rao Maldev of Marwar by his mistress, Tipu Gudi. This was a dolo union as opposed to formal marriage, representing the bride's lower status in her father's household, and serving as an expression of vassalage to an overlord. The dating of this event is not recorded.

Death

On 3 October 1605, Akbar fell ill from an attack of dysentery from which he never recovered. He is believed to have died on 26 October 1605. He was buried at his mausoleum in Sikandra, Agra, which lies a kilometer next to the tomb of Mariam-uz-Zamani, his favourite and chief consort.

Legacy
Akbar left a rich legacy both for the Mughal Empire as well as the Indian subcontinent in general. He firmly entrenched the authority of the Mughal Empire in India and beyond, after it had been threatened by the Afghans during his father's reign, establishing its military and diplomatic superiority. During his reign, the nature of the state changed to a secular and liberal one, with emphasis on cultural integration. He also introduced several far-sighted social reforms, including prohibiting sati, legalizing widow remarriage, and raising the age of marriage.

Folk tales revolving around him and Birbal, one of his navratnas, are popular in India. He and his Hindu wife, Mariam-uz-Zamani, in the popular culture known as  'Jodha Bai'  are widely popular as the latter is believed to have been the prime inspiration and driving force for Akbar's promotion of secularism and universal benevolence (Sulh-i-Qul).

Bhavishya Purana is a minor Purana that depicts the various Hindu holy days and includes a section devoted to the various dynasties that ruled India, dating its oldest portion to 500 CE and newest to the 18th century. It contains a story about Akbar in which he is compared to the other Mughal rulers. The section called "Akbar Bahshaha Varnan", written in Sanskrit describes his birth as a "reincarnation" of a sage who immolated himself on seeing the first Mughal ruler Babur, who is described as the "cruel king of Mlecchas (Muslims)". In this text it is stated that Akbar "was a miraculous child" and that he would not follow the previous "violent ways" of the Mughals.

Citing Akbar's melding of the disparate 'fiefdoms' of India into the Mughal Empire as well as the lasting legacy of "pluralism and tolerance" that "underlies the values of the modern republic of India", Time magazine included his name in its list of top 25 world leaders.

On the other hand, his legacy is explicitly negative in Pakistan for the same reasons. Historian Mubarak Ali, while studying the image of Akbar in Pakistani textbooks, observes that Akbar "is conveniently ignored and not mentioned in any school textbook from class one to matriculation", as opposed to the omnipresence of emperor Aurangzeb. He quotes historian Ishtiaq Hussain Qureshi, who said that, due to his religious tolerance, "Akbar had so weakened Islam through his policies that it could not be restored to its dominant position in the affairs." A common thread among Pakistani historians is to blame Akbar's Rajput policy. In a conclusion, after analyzing many textbooks, Mubarak Ali says that "Akbar is criticized for bringing Muslims and Hindus together as one nation and putting the separate identity of the Muslims in danger. This policy of Akbar contradicts the theory of Two-Nation and therefore makes him an unpopular figure in Pakistan."

Issue
Akbar's sons were:
 Hassan Mirza ( 19 October 1564;  5 November 1564) (twin with Hussain Mirza)—with Mariam-uz-Zamani Begum
 Hussain Mirza ( 19 October 1564;  29 October 1564) (twin with Hassan Mirza)—with Mariam-uz-Zamani Begum
 Shahzada Salim ( 31 August 1569;  28 October 1627)—with Mariam-uz-Zamani Begum—He succeeded Akbar to the throne.
 Murad Mirza ( 15 June 1570;  12 May 1599)—with Mariam-uz-Zamani Begum or a concubine—Fostered by Salima Sultan Begum for the first few years and then returned to his mother's care before 1575.
 Daniyal Mirza ( 11 September 1572;  19 March 1605)— with a concubine — Fostered by Mariam-uz-Zamani Begum.
 Shahzada Khusrao ( infancy)—with a niece Rai Kalyan Mal of Bikaner 

His daughters were:
 Fatima Banu Begum (infancy)
 Shahzada Khanam ( 21 November 1569)—with Bibi Salima—Fostered by Mariam Makani—Married to Muzaffar Hussain Mirza, Timurid Prince.
 Mahi Begum ( 7 April 1577)—with Nathi Bai
 Shakr-un-Nissa Begum ( 1 January 1653)—with Bibi Daulat Shad—Married to Shahrukh Mirza.
 Firoze Khannum ( 1575)—with a concubine —Fostered by Mariam-uz-Zamani Begum
 Aram Banu Begum ( 22 December 1584;  17 June 1624)—with Bibi Daulat Shad

He had also adopted several children including:
 Kishnavati Bai ( August 1609)—daughter of Sekhavat Kachvahi Durjan Sal. Akbar took her as his own and had her married to Sawai Raja Sur Singh of Marwar. She became the mother of Maharaja Gaj Singh of Marwar and Manbhavati Bai, wife of Parviz Mirza.

In popular culture

Films and television 
 Shahenshah Akbar is a 1943 Indian Hindi-language film about the emperor, directed by G. R. Sethi.
 Akbar was portrayed in the award-winning 1960 Hindi movie Mughal-e-Azam (The great Mughal), in which his character was played by Prithviraj Kapoor.
 The Government of India's Films Division produced Akbar, a documentary film about the emperor, in 1967 which was directed by Shanti S. Varma. It won the National Film Award for Best Educational/Motivational/Instructional Film.
 Om Shivpuri played Akbar in the 1978 movie Bhakti Mein Shakti.
 Akbar Saleem Anarkali is a 1979 Indian Telugu-language film about the Anarkali legend directed by N. T. Rama Rao, with Rao also portraying the role of Akbar.
 Akbar was portrayed by Amjad Khan in the 1979 movie Meera.
 Akbar was portrayed by Hrithik Roshan in the 2008 Bollywood film Jodhaa Akbar.
 Akbar and Birbal were portrayed in the Hindi series Akbar-Birbal aired on Zee TV in the late 1990s where Akbar's role was played by Vikram Gokhale.
 A television series, called Akbar the Great, directed by Akbar Khan was aired on DD National in the 1990s.
 Since 2013–2015, a television series, called Jodha Akbar aired on Zee TV, in which the role of Akbar was played by actor Rajat Tokas.
 In the Motu Patlu episode "Motu Akbar The Great" John fools Motu into believing he's playing as Akbar in a Hit Film.
 Akbar was portrayed by Uday Tikekar in EPIC channel's critically acclaimed historical drama Siyaasat (based on the novel The Twentieth Wife).
 In Sony TV's historical drama Bharat Ka Veer Putra – Maharana Pratap, Akbar was at first portrayed by Krip Suri and later by Avinesh Rekhi.
 Akbar is portrayed by Kiku Sharda in BIG Magic's sitcom Akbar Birbal.
 Saurabh Raj Jain portrayed Akbar in the follow up sitcom by BIG Magic, Hazir Jawab Birbal.
 Abhishek Nigam portrayed Akbar in BIG MAGIC's historical drama Akbar – Rakht Se Takht Tak Ka Safar.
 Mohammed Iqbal Khan played the role of Akbar in ABP News' documentary series, Bharatvarsh.
 Akbar Rakht Se Takht Ka Safar is a 2017 Indian drama television series tracing Akbar's journey to the Mughal throne. Abhishek Nigam portrayed the role of Akbar.
 Shahbaz Khan played the role of Akbar in the Colors television show Dastaan-E-Mohabbat Salim Anarkali.
 Ali Asgar portrayed the emperor in the 2020 Indian comedy television series, Akbar Ka Bal Birbal.
 Naseeruddin Shah portrayed the Emperor in ZEE5's web series Taj: Divided by Blood

Fiction 
 Akbar is a principal character in Indu Sundaresan's award-winning novel The Twentieth Wife (2002) as well as in its sequel The Feast of Roses (2003).
 A fictionalised Akbar plays an important supporting role in Kim Stanley Robinson's 2002 novel, The Years of Rice and Salt.
 Akbar is also a major character in Salman Rushdie's 2008 novel The Enchantress of Florence.
 Bertrice Small is known for incorporating historical figures as primary characters in her romance novels, and Akbar is no exception. He is a prominent figure in two of her novels, and mentioned several times in a third, which takes place after his death. In This Heart of Mine the heroine becomes Akbar's fortieth "wife" for a time, while Wild Jasmine and Darling Jasmine centre around the life of his half-British daughter, Yasaman Kama Begum (alias Jasmine).
 In Kunal Basu's The Miniaturist, the story revolves around a young painter during Akbar's time who paints his own version of the Akbarnamu
 Akbar is mentioned as 'Raja Baadshah' in the Chhattisgarhi folktale of "Mohna de gori kayina"
 Akbar is the main character in Empire of the Moghul: Ruler of the World by Alex Rutherford, the third book in a sextet based on the six great Mughal Emperors of the Mughal Dynasty.

Video games 
 Akbar is featured in the video game Sid Meier's Civilization IV: Beyond the Sword as a "great general" available in the game.
 Akbar is the AI Personality of India in Age of Empires III: The Asian Dynasties

See also
 Akbar II
 Ashoka
 List of people known as the Great
 Maharana Pratap

Notes

References

Bibliography

Further reading

 Abu'l-Fazl ibn Mubarak Akbar-namah Edited with commentary by Muhammad Sadiq Ali (Kanpur-Lucknow: Nawal Kishore) 1881–83 Three Vols. (Persian)
 Abu al-Fazl ibn Mubarak Akbarnamah Edited by Maulavi Abd Al-Rahim. Bibliotheca Indica Series (Calcutta: Asiatic Society of Bengal) 1877–1887 Three Vols. (Persian)
 Henry Beveridge (Trans.) The Akbarnama of Ab-ul-Fazl Bibliotheca Indica Series (Calcutta: Asiatic Society of Bengal) 1897 Three Vols.
 Haji Muhammad 'Arif Qandahari Tarikh-i-Akbari (Better known as Tarikh-i-Qandahari) edited & Annotated by Haji Mu'in'd-Din Nadwi, Dr. Azhar 'Ali Dihlawi & Imtiyaz 'Ali 'Arshi (Rampur Raza Library) 1962 (Persian)
 Martí Escayol, Maria Antònia. "Antoni de Montserrat in the Mughal Garden of good government European construction of Indian nature", Word, Image, Text: Studies in Literary and Visual Culture, ed. Shormistha Panja et al., Orient Blackswan, New Delhi, 2009. 
 Satyananda Giri, Akbar, Trafford Publishing, 2009, 
 John Correia-Afonso, Letters from the Mughal court, Bombay, 1980.
 
 
 
 
 Akbar, Emperor of India by Richard von Garbe 1857–1927 (ebook)
 The Adventures of Akbar by Flora Annie Steel, 1847–1929 -(ebook)

External links

 
 The Drama of Akbar by Muhammad Husain Azad from 1922.

 
1542 births
1605 deaths
Child monarchs from Asia
16th-century Indian monarchs
Indian people of Iranian descent
Indian people of Turkic descent
Indian warriors
Mughal emperors
Muslim monarchs
People from Agra
People from Umerkot
17th-century Indian monarchs
Indian Sunni Muslims
Deaths from dysentery
Founders of religions
Illiterate monarchs